The 1992–93 Eliteserien season was the 54th season of ice hockey in Norway. Ten teams participated in the league, and Vålerenga Ishockey won the championship.

Grunnserien

Eliteserien

Playoff Qualification

Group A

Group B

Playoffs

External links
Season on hockeyarchives.info

Nor
1992-93
GET